Bengal Gazetti was a historic Bengali weekly newspaper published in India in 1816 or 1818 and is one of the oldest publications in India. It is believed to the first Bengali Language newspaper. The journal was edited by Ganga Kishore Bhattacharya, a former employee of Serampore Mission Press. The newspaper was short lived due to paper being an expensive commodity.

History
Bengal Gazetti was published in May 1818. The publisher of the magazine was Ganga Kishore Bhattacharya and supported by Harachandra Roy. It continued to publish for about a year more. No copies remain of the journal. It is believed to be the first Bengali language newspapers but there is conflicting reports on when it started publication; 1816 or 1818. There is some controversy over weather the Gazetti or the Samachar Darpan, published by Serampore Mission Press. which started publication in 1818. The Bengal Gazetti was the first newspaper in India controlled entirely by natives.

References

Bengali-language newspapers published in India
Defunct newspapers published in India
Publications established in 1816